Alexandros "Alexis" Kyritsis (alternate spelling: Kiritsis) (born May 18, 1982) is a Greek professional basketball player. He is a talented offensive combo guard-swingman.

Professional career
In his professional career, Kyritsis played with some of the following clubs: Papagou, Aris, Maroussi, AEK Athens, PAOK, Kavala, Ilysiakos, Panathinaikos, Ikaros Kallitheas, Panionios, Doxa Lefkadas, and Doukas.

National team career
Kyritsis won the silver medal at the 2009 Mediterranean Games, while playing with the Greek under-26 national team.

Personal life
Kyritsis' father, Michalis, is a former professional basketball player and coach. Alexis and his father both played with Panathinaikos.

Awards and accomplishments

Pro career
2× Greek Cup Winner: (2004, 2012)
3× Greek Second Division Top Scorer: (2003, 2017, 2018)

Greek junior national team
2009 Mediterranean Games:

References

External links
Euroleague.net Profile
FIBA Europe Profile
Eurobasket.com Profile
Greek Basket League Profile 
AEK Profile
Hellenic Basketball Federation Profile 

1982 births
Living people
AEK B.C. players
Aris B.C. players
Competitors at the 2009 Mediterranean Games
Doukas B.C. players
Doxa Lefkadas B.C. players
Greek men's basketball players
Greek Basket League players
Ikaros B.C. players
Ilysiakos B.C. players
Kavala B.C. players
Maroussi B.C. players
Mediterranean Games medalists in basketball
Mediterranean Games silver medalists for Greece
Panathinaikos B.C. players
Panionios B.C. players
P.A.O.K. BC players
Papagou B.C. players
Point guards
Psychiko B.C. players
Shooting guards
Small forwards
Basketball players from Athens